Iowa Highway 140 (Iowa 140) is a  state highway in northwestern Iowa.  The route begins at U.S. Highway 20 (US 20) at Moville.  It heads northeast and then due north; it ends at Iowa 3 near Remsen.

Route description
Iowa Highway 140 begins at U.S. Highway 20 at Moville.  It goes northeast through Moville towards Kingsley adjacent to the Little Sioux River.  At Kingsley, Iowa 140 turns north and continues north for  until it intersects Iowa Highway 3 southeast of Remsen, where it ends.

History
Iowa 140 was created on July 1, 1926, when the U.S. Highway System was created.  The highway has previously been Primary Road No. 30, but it was renumbered to avoid confusion with the new US 30. Upon creation, the route was largely the same as it is today.  In 1931, Iowa 140 was extended south to Hornick and west to US 75 at Sloan.  It was extended west again in 1958 when I-29 was built, making its length .  In 1961, Iowa 141's western end was redirected away from Sioux City and directed to Sloan via Hornick on Iowa 140.  Upon this designation, Iowa 140 was truncated at Hornick.  Three years later, Iowa 140 was truncated south of US 20, to its current extent, only to be truncated north of Kingsley the next year.  From 1965 to 1980, Iowa 140 was a  spur route.  Iowa 140 was restored to its current extent in 1980.

Major intersections

References

External links

End of Iowa 140 at Iowa Highway Ends

140
Transportation in Woodbury County, Iowa
Transportation in Plymouth County, Iowa